Frederick Stanley Bacon (February 27, 1877 – March 16, 1961) was an American football coach and lawyer. He served as the head football coach at Trinity College in Hartford, Connecticut in 1902, compiling a record of 0–4. Bacon was an 1899 graduate of Trinity. He also earned degree from Yale Law School and worked as a attorney for the state highway department in Connecticut.

Head coaching record

References

External links
 

1877 births
1961 deaths
Connecticut lawyers
Trinity Bantams football coaches
Trinity College (Connecticut) alumni
Yale Law School alumni
Sportspeople from Middletown, Connecticut
Coaches of American football from Connecticut